The Ministry of Commerce, Industries and Tourism of the Republic of Somaliland  is a cabinet ministry in the government of Somaliland. which is concerned with the regulation and implementation of policies applicable to domestic and foreign trade. The current minister is Mohamoud Hassan Saad (Saajin)

Ministers

See also

 Politics of Somaliland
 Cabinet of Somaliland

References

External links
 Ministry of Commerce of the Republic of Somaliland

Government of Somaliland
Politics of Somaliland
Government ministries of Somaliland